This is the list of Winter Universiade records in speed skating maintained by FISU, current after the 2017 Winter Universiade.

Men

Women

References

Speed skating records
Speed skating-related lists
Speed skating
Speed skating at the Winter Universiade